In Greek mythology, there were two women known as Philonoe  or Phylonoe:

Philonoe, a Spartan princess as the daughter of King Tyndareus and Leda, daughter of King Thestius of Pleuron. She was the sister of Castor and Pollux, Helen, Clytemnestra, Timandra and Phoebe. Artemis made her immortal.
Philonoe, daughter of Iobates and first wife of Bellerophon by whom, she became the mother of Isander (Peisander), Hippolochus and Laodamia (Deidamia or Hippodamia). Philonoe was the sister of Stheneboea who loved Bellerophon more than her current husband, King Proetus of Argos. She was promised to Bellerophon after he vanquished the Chimera, the Amazons, and more tasks. Bellerophon was given half the kingdom as well as Philonoe's hand in marriage. She was also known under several other names: Alkimedousa, Anticleia, Pasandra or Cassandra.

Notes

References 

 Apollodorus, The Library with an English Translation by Sir James George Frazer, F.B.A., F.R.S. in 2 Volumes, Cambridge, MA, Harvard University Press; London, William Heinemann Ltd. 1921. ISBN 0-674-99135-4. Online version at the Perseus Digital Library. Greek text available from the same website.
Diodorus Siculus, The Library of History translated by Charles Henry Oldfather. Twelve volumes. Loeb Classical Library. Cambridge, Massachusetts: Harvard University Press; London: William Heinemann, Ltd. 1989. Vol. 3. Books 4.59–8. Online version at Bill Thayer's Web Site
Diodorus Siculus, Bibliotheca Historica. Vol 1-2. Immanel Bekker. Ludwig Dindorf. Friedrich Vogel. in aedibus B. G. Teubneri. Leipzig. 1888-1890. Greek text available at the Perseus Digital Library.
Hesiod, Catalogue of Women from Homeric Hymns, Epic Cycle, Homerica translated by Evelyn-White, H G. Loeb Classical Library Volume 57. London: William Heinemann, 1914. Online version at theoi.com
Pseudo-Clement, Recognitions from Ante-Nicene Library Volume 8, translated by Smith, Rev. Thomas. T. & T. Clark, Edinburgh. 1867. Online version at theoi.com
 Strabo, The Geography of Strabo. Edition by H.L. Jones. Cambridge, Mass.: Harvard University Press; London: William Heinemann, Ltd. 1924. Online version at the Perseus Digital Library.
 Strabo, Geographica edited by A. Meineke. Leipzig: Teubner. 1877. Greek text available at the Perseus Digital Library.

Princesses in Greek mythology
Lycians
Laconian characters in Greek mythology
Lycia